Between Love and Hate is a 1993 American television movie directed by Rod Hardy.

Plot
Matt, a 19 year old swimming coach, who is a virgin, has an affair with Vivian, a married mother in her forties. When her husband Justin finds out, she is forced to end it. This results in a chain of reactions from photocopying of love letters leading up to Matt shooting her dead.

Cast
Susan Lucci.....Vivian Conrad
Barry Bostwick.....Justin Conrad
Patrick Van Horn.....Matt Templeton

External links

1993 television films
1993 films
1993 crime drama films
1993 romantic drama films
Adultery in films
American crime drama films
American romantic drama films
Drama films based on actual events
1990s English-language films
Films about dysfunctional families
Films about virginity
Films directed by Rod Hardy
Crime films based on actual events
American drama television films
1990s American films